Galiny may refer to:

Galiny, Łódź Voivodeship (central Poland)
Galiny, Gmina Bartoszyce in Warmian-Masurian Voivodeship (north Poland)
Galiny, Gmina Górowo Iławeckie in Warmian-Masurian Voivodeship (north Poland)